René Hellermann (born 7 June 2000) is an Austrian footballer who plays as a forward for SC Imst in the Regionalliga Tirol.

Career

Club career
Hellermann started his career with the youth team of Innsbrucker AC. In 2006 he came to the Tyrol football academy where he played for all teams (U15, U16, U18).

In 2018, he signed with FC Liefering. He was also a member of the FC Red Bull Salzburg U19 team during the 2017–18 UEFA Youth League.

He made his professional debut playing for Red Bull Salzburg's feeder team, Liefering, against Floridsdorfer AC on 16 March 2018.

On 7 January 2020, Hellermann moved to FC Admira Wacker Mödling, where he was registered for the clubs reserve team in the Austrian Regionalliga.

References

External links

 

Living people
2000 births
Austrian footballers
Austria youth international footballers
Association football forwards
FC Liefering players
FC Admira Wacker Mödling players
Austrian Regionalliga players
2. Liga (Austria) players